Women's Pioneer Housing is a British housing association founded in 1920, the first dedicated to housing single women.

History
Women's Pioneer Housing was founded in 1920, to help provide housing for the new generation of single, professional women in London following the First World War.  

It was founded by Etheldred Browning a former Irish suffragist who had run the women’s section of the Garden City and Town Planning Association (GCTPA). Other founding members included Geraldine Lennox of the Women's Social and Political Union (WSPU), Lady Rhondda, and Ray Strachey. Sydney Mary Bushell, a member of the executive committee of the GCTPA and hon sec of their women’s section, was also a founder. They incorporated Women's Pioneer Housing as a public utility company on 4 October 1920 ‘to cater for the housing requirements of professional and other women of moderate means who require individual homes at moderate rents’. 

They raised money to purchase its first property, 167 Holland Park Avenue, in 1921.  By 1936 they had 36 properties, primarily in west London and one in Brighton, run on a co-operative basis.

Skilled women contractors were central to the organisation's development, including the architect Gertrude Leverkus and the first woman chartered accountants, Ethel Watts and Miriam Homesham. Etheldred Browning ran the organisation until her retirement in 1938.

Housing provision
Women's Pioneer Housing is still active as a social housing provider for women, with offices at Wood Lane, White City, west London. The Chief Executive since 2022 is Tracey Downie, former Executive Director of Housing Management at Homes for Haringey. 

It is registered as a Co-operative & Community Benefit Society with the Financial Conduct Authority and as a Registered Social Landlord with the Homes and Communities Agency.

It continues to house single women, mostly now nominated by local authorities. 

Plans for a new housing development at the organisation's base in Wood Lane were announced in 2019. After public consultation the revised plans were granted planning permission in November 2022.

As of 2019, it was exploring a possible merger with Housing for Women.

The organisation celebrated its centenary in 2020, with an exhibition Pioneering Courage: Housing and the Working Woman 1919 – 1939 based on three years of research into their history.

References

Housing associations
1920 establishments in the United Kingdom
Organizations established in 1920
Feminist organisations in the United Kingdom
First-wave feminism
Women's organisations based in the United Kingdom
Social history of the United Kingdom
Suffragettes
Women in London